The first USS Gretchen (SP-423) was a patrol vessel acquired by the United States Navy in 1917.

Gretchen was built as a private motorboat. On 30 July 1917, the U.S. Navy acquired her from her owner, Sylvanus Stokes, for use as a section patrol boat during World War I. She was placed in service as USS Gretchen (SP-423).

Assigned to the 5th Naval District, Gretchen was found unsuited for use in patrol duties. The Navy returned her to her owner on 1 November 1917.

References
 
 NavSource Online: Section Patrol Craft Photo Archive: Gretchen (SP 423)

Patrol vessels of the United States Navy
World War I patrol vessels of the United States